The Aeronca L-16 was a United States Army liaison aircraft built by Aeronca. It saw extensive service during the Korean War. It was essentially a militarized version of the Aeronca Champion. From 1955 large numbers were transferred to the Civil Air Patrol.

Derived from the Aeronca Champion (Aeronca Model 7 series), the L-16 primarily replaced the similar Piper L-4 (a modified Piper Cub) in U.S. military service. The L-16 afforded generally better performance, stability, visibility and comfort, while its safety characteristics were a mix of better and worse than the L-4.

Variants
L-16A (7BCM Champion)
 509 built, 376 of them produced for the Air National Guard, used in Korea 1950, 85 hp (63 kW) Continental O-190-1 (C85) engine. 
L-16B (7CCM Champion)
Military version of the Model 7AC used as training aircraft for United States Army, 90 hp (67 kW) Continental O-205-1 (C90) engine. 100 were built.

Operators

 National Guard of the United States
 United States Army
 Civil Air Patrol

 National Safety Forces

Specifications (L-16B)

See also

References

Bibliography
 
 Eden, Paul and Moeng, Soph, eds. The Complete Encyclopedia of World Aircraft. London: Amber Books Ltd., 2002. .
 

 

1940s United States military utility aircraft
Aeronca aircraft
High-wing aircraft
Single-engined tractor aircraft
Aircraft first flown in 1944